The Around the Bay Road Race (ATB) is a long distance road race annually in Hamilton, Ontario. The event currently features a 30 kilometer race, a 5 kilometer race, relay races, and virtual races. First held in 1894, it is the oldest long distance road race in North America.

Since it began, the race has been held every year except for 1917 to 1919 (due to World War I), 1925 to 1935, 1962 (due to construction), and 2020 and 2021 (due to the COVID-19 pandemic).

History
The Hamilton Herald Newspaper and cigar store owner "Billy" Carroll, originated and sponsored the "Herald Road Race", the first Around the Bay Road Race, run on Christmas Day, 1894. Thirteen racers ran the 19 mile and 168 yard course around Hamilton Harbour. Billy Marshall won the race and was awarded a $25 silver cup and some boxes of cigars.

In the early 20th century, Jack Caffery and William Sherring battled it out and won two "Bay" races each.  Famed Canadian-Onondaga runner Tom Longboat also took the first major victory of his career here, in 1906.

Scotty Rankine won a record seven races in the 1930s and 1940s, while Peter Maher won his fifth Bay race in 1996, tying the record of local Gord Dickson, who had five wins in the late 1950s.

Women were first allowed to enter in 1979.

In 2005, the ATB partnered with St. Joseph's Healthcare Foundation and, for the first time, became a fundraising event.

Race
All races start on York Boulevard, one block west of the FirstOntario Centre. All races finish inside FirstOntario Centre. On Sunday, March 29, 2007, over 9,000 participants crossed the finish line.

The 30 kilometre race is also known as the Billy Sherring Memorial Road Race. It is also called the 30K Around The Bay.

Top fundraisers

Winners
Key:

30k

The 30 kilometre course was certified in 1982. Prior to then, the race was contested over a few different distances.

References

Further reading

External links
 Official Website
 Results, Photos, and Videos
 St. Joseph's Healthcare Hamilton

Sport in Hamilton, Ontario
History of Hamilton, Ontario
Recurring sporting events established in 1894
Long-distance running competitions
Road running competitions
1894 establishments in Ontario
Annual sporting events in Canada